Dr. Jie (Jackie) Li is a scientist and Professor at the University of Michigan.

Career 
Jie (Jackie) Li received her MA in Geophysics from Harvard University in 1997. She continued her education at Harvard, completing her Ph.D. in Earth and Planetary Sciences in 1998. She is currently a Professor in Geochemistry and Mineral Physics at the University of Michigan. Li is engaged in wide-ranging research that includes carbon at high pressures and the origin and evolution of terrestrial plants, terrestrial-like moons and asteroids in the solar system. Recent research topics that she is engaged in are: 
 Light element composition of the Earth's core
 Spin state of iron in the Earth's lower mantle
 State of Mercury's core and the origin of its magnetic field
 Core formation during the early history of the Earth
 Formation of the Earth's continental crust

Dr. Li is a member of the Extreme Physics and Chemistry Community Scientific Steering Committee of the Deep Carbon Observatory.

Notes and references 

Most of Earth's carbon may be hidden in the planet's inner core, new model suggests

Year of birth missing (living people)
Living people
Harvard University alumni
University of Michigan faculty
University of Illinois Urbana-Champaign faculty
Geophysicists
Planetary scientists
Women planetary scientists